The Walther SSP is a precision target shooting pistol made in Germany by Carl Walther GmbH Sportwaffen. The SSP was created in response to ISSF rule changes to the 25 m Rapid Fire Pistol in 2005 which effectively rendered the Walther OSP obsolete. The new rules precluded use of the .22 Short cartridge as well as wrap-around grips and light trigger pulls (pressure required to pull/activate trigger).

Although the new pistol rules for the rapid fire event were now identical to those for 25 m Standard Pistol, to allow competitors to compete in both competitions using the same pistol, manufacturers like Walther still designed new pistols like the SSP to perform optimally in the rapid fire events.

See also
Walther OSP, predecessor of the SSP.

External links
 Walther SSP product page

Walther semi-automatic pistols
.22 LR pistols